Niels Glob was a Roman Catholic prelate who served as Bishop of Viborg (1478–1498).

Biography
On 20 November 1478, Niels Glob was appointed during the papacy of Pope Sixtus IV as Bishop of Viborg. He served as Bishop of Viborg until his death in 1498.

References 

15th-century Roman Catholic bishops in Denmark
Bishops appointed by Pope Sixtus IV
1498 deaths